Ponnani Juma Masjid or Ponnani Valiya Jumath Palli located at Ponnani in Malappuram district is a mosque that deserves historical importance in Muslim mosques in Kerala. The Juma Masjid played an important role in the intellectual field of Ponnani, once referred to as the 'Little Mecca' of Malabar. At that time, the mosque was also the headquarters of those seeking knowledge in Ponnani.

History

William Logan has recorded in the second part of his Malabar Manual that the Ponnani Grand Juma Masjid  was built by Sheikh Zainuddin in 1510 (Hijra 925) A.D.  There are those who believe that the construction may have taken place in that year as the Year 1519 is the equivalent of Hijra 925. Sheikh Zainuddin Ibn Ali Ibn Ahamed Maabari , also known as the great Zainuddin Makhdoom, the builder of the mosque, died in July 1522  and it is believed that the construction of the mosque was completed before that. The interior of the Ponnani Grand Juma Masjid is 90 feet long and 60 feet wide.

After the construction of the mosque, Sheikh Zainuddin Makhdoom himself started teaching in the Masjid. This is believed to be the beginning of the 'Pallidars' system in Malabar.

Sitting before wick lamp
There was a tradition to sit around the oil lamp installed inside the mosque, study religion and get the Musliar status from Makhdoom. For this, students used to come from all over Malabar. The way you sit around the oil lamp and get the Musliar status is called 'Sitting before wick lamp'. 
The Logan Malabar Manual records that in 1887, about 400 people came from the other lands and studied at the Ponnani Grand Masjid. Among those who were close to the mosque were Kunjayan Muslyar, a native of North Malabar who lived 200 years ago, and author of 'Noolmuhammad' and 'Kappapat', Umer Khazi, the poet and brave man who fought against British rule. Mamburam Thangal was a visitor to the mosque.

Mosques in Kerala
Grand mosques
Religious buildings and structures in Malappuram district
1510 establishments in India
Mosques completed in the 1510s
Religious buildings and structures completed in 1510

References